Belfast River may refer to:

Belfast River (Dominica), a river in the island nation of Dominica
Belfast River (Georgia), a river in the United States